The Louisville Colonels were a Major League Baseball team that also played in the American Association (AA) throughout that league's ten-year existence from 1882 until 1891. They were known as the Louisville Eclipse from 1882 to 1884, and as the Louisville Colonels from 1885 to 1891; the latter name derived from the historic title of the Kentucky Colonel. After the AA folded in 1891, the Colonels joined the National League and played through the 1899 season.

"Colonels" was also the name of several minor league baseball teams that played in Louisville, Kentucky, in the 20th century.

American Association
After spending several years as a well-known semi-pro team, the Eclipse joined the newly founded American Association in 1882. The Eclipse's backer, local distiller J. H. Pank, was named vice-president of the AA, and the team was to be run by a consortium led by W. L. Lyons. Their star player, infielder Pete Browning, who had achieved some measure of local fame, remained with the team when they ascended to major league status. The team got off to a good start, finishing in second place, their best finish for several seasons.

Managing partner Lyons resigned in mid-1888, and was succeeded by team secretary Mordecai Davidson. The following season, the team sank to a 27–111 record and a last place finish. As a result, Davidson surrendered control of the team to the AA. The Colonels lost five straight games in two days, including a tripleheader on September 7 and a doubleheader the next day, all against the Baltimore Orioles. With the prohibition of tripleheaders in the early 1920s, this record still stands. The 1889 Colonels were the first team in major league history to lose 100 games in a single season.

In 1890 the team, which had been purchased by Barney Dreyfuss, bounced back with a vengeance. The Colonels won the 1890 pennant in the AA and became the first and only team to rise from the cellar to the pennant in one season. That year the AA was considered only the third-best behind the NL and the Players' League.

National League
In 1892 the American Association dissolved, and the Colonels moved to the National League and played there until 1899. In 1900 Dreyfuss acquired controlling interest of the Pittsburgh Pirates and brought 14 Colonels players with him, including future Hall of Famers Honus Wagner and Fred Clarke, marking the end of the original Colonels organization and Louisville as a Major League Baseball host city.

Notable achievements
In September 1882, Louisville pitchers threw two no-hitters in the span of nine days; Tony Mullane on September 11, followed by Guy Hecker on September 19.  Other Louisville pitchers who threw no-hitters were Ben Sanders on August 22, 1892, and Deacon Phillippe, a rookie, on May 25, 1899.  Pete Browning hit for the cycle twice for Louisville, on August 8, 1886 and June 7, 1889.

Notable Colonels players
 Pete Browning (outfielder)
 Fred Clarke (outfielder–manager)
 Harry Davis (first baseman–manager)
 Jerry Denny (third baseman)
 Jack Glasscock (shortstop)
 Dummy Hoy (center fielder)
 Hughie Jennings (shortstop)
 Tony Mullane (pitcher)
 Deacon Phillippe (pitcher)
 Toad Ramsey (pitcher)
 Rube Waddell (pitcher)
 Honus Wagner (shortstop)
 Nick Altrock (pitcher)
 Jimmy Collins (third baseman)

Baseball Hall of Famers

See also

 Sports in Louisville, Kentucky

External links
 Louisville Colonels page at Baseball Reference

 
Baseball teams established in 1882
Baseball teams disestablished in 1899
Defunct baseball teams in Kentucky
Defunct Major League Baseball teams
American Association (1882–1891) baseball teams
1882 establishments in Kentucky
1899 disestablishments in Kentucky